Alexander Kirk may refer to:
Alexander Carnegie Kirk (1830–1892), Scottish engineer
Alexander Comstock Kirk (1888–1979), American diplomat
Alexander Kirk (actor), in Mount Pleasant

See also
Kirk (surname)
A.C. Kirk (disambiguation)